The 2018 Munster Senior Football Championship will be the 2018 installment of the annual Munster Senior Football Championship organised by the Munster GAA. The fixtures were announced on 31 October 2017.

Kerry won the championship, defeating rivals Cork in the final.

Teams
The Munster championship is contested by all six counties in the Irish province of Munster.

Bracket

Fixtures

Quarter-finals

Semi-finals

Final

See also
 2018 All-Ireland Senior Football Championship
 2018 Connacht Senior Football Championship
 2018 Leinster Senior Football Championship
 2018 Ulster Senior Football Championship

References

External links
 https://web.archive.org/web/20121028164800/http://munstergaa.ie/

2M
Munster Senior Football Championship